Marchandiomyces corallinus is a lichenicolous fungus that parasitizes lichens, particularly those in the genera Physcia, Parmelia, Flavoparmelia, Lepraria, Pertusaria, Lasallia, and Lecanora. It is commonly found in eastern North America and Europe.

Parasitism 
Despite most lichen parasites belonging to the phylum Ascomycota (95%), M. corallinus is in the phylum Basidiomycota.

References

Corticiales
Lichenicolous fungi
Fungi described in 1847
Fungi of Europe
Fungi of North America